Silas Tertius Rand Bill (September 9, 1842 in Liverpool, Nova Scotia- December 1890) was a Nova Scotia born politician, merchant, ship-owner and glass sculptor. He was elected to the House of Commons of Canada in 1878 as a Member of the Liberal-Conservative Party to represent the riding of Queens. He assisted Peter Newsome with his work whilst visiting London, England.

He lived in Liverpool. Bill served as treasurer for Queens County. He never married.

References

External links
 

1842 births
1890 deaths
People from Queens County, Nova Scotia
Conservative Party of Canada (1867–1942) MPs
Members of the House of Commons of Canada from Nova Scotia